Douin may refer to:

Charles Isidore Douin (1858–1944), French botanist
Jean-Philippe Douin (1940–2016), French Air Force general